Chloé Aurard (born 15 March 1999) is a French ice hockey player for the Northeastern Huskies and the French national team.

Chloe graduated from Vermont Academy in Saxtons River, Vermont in 2018, and from Northeastern University in Boston.

She represented France at the 2019 IIHF Women's World Championship.

Awards and honors
2020–21 Second Team CCM/AHCA All-American
2020–21 All-USCHO.com Second Team

External links

References

1999 births
Living people
French expatriate ice hockey people
French expatriate sportspeople in the United States
French women's ice hockey forwards
Northeastern Huskies women's ice hockey players
People from Saint-Martin-d'Hères
French twins
Sportspeople from Isère
Vermont Academy alumni